China B is a secondary football team run occasionally as support for the China national football team.

History
Before Joining FIFA, the Chinese national football team's main duty was to play friendlies with friendly countries. Sometimes a B team was created when the national team was occupied elsewhere. There was no obvious age or skill difference between the A and B teams. In 1957, the national white team was defeated by the national red team and lost the ticket to Melbourne. After the defeat, the national white team was regarded as the national B team before relegating to a regional team, the Tianjin Football Team. More B teams were created from time and time since. Coaches include Zhang Jingtian, Ha Zengguang, Fang Renqiu and Chen Fulai,

Chinese Football Association organised a China B team in 1981 with the name of China Hope in order to provide more international experiences for the young talents of the league. The team was dissolved in 1982 after a brawl with the Tunisia national football team. In 1984 another B team was established, coached by Zhang Jingtian. In 1986 a third national team, the national yellow team was created based on the championship team Liaoning FC.

The B team sometimes compete in the CFA leagues and won the league title in 1989 under the coaching of Xu Genbao. In the same year FIFA and IOC agreed to limit soccer players participating in the Olympics to be under 23, and the China B was rebranded as the China national under-23 football team. 

On 2 May 2017, a new China B team was reorganised by China national football team manager Marcello Lippi.

Coaching staff

Players

Current squad 
 The following 22 players were called up in the training camp as China national B football team. Before the training began, injured Xu Xin and Yang Xu were replaced by Liu Junshuai and Yang Liyu.
 Match date: 15 - 17 May 2017

Recent call-ups
The following players have been called up within the last twelve months.

Recent and forthcoming fixtures

2017

References

B-team
Asian national B association football teams